Eugene Blackburn Gary was a chief justice on the South Carolina Supreme Court.

Gary was born in Cokesbury, South Carolina on August 22, 1854. Gary enrolled at the University of South Carolina in 1872 and received a degree in the classical branches that same year. He was admitted to practice law in South Carolina in 1875. He maintained a law practice in Abbeville, South Carolina until 1894. He was elected as the chairman of the Abbeville Democratic party in 1882, 1888, 1890, and 1892. He served one term in the South Carolina General Assembly and twice as the lieutenant governor. He was elected as an associate justice of the South Carolina Supreme Court during his second term as the lieutenant governor. He was sworn in as an associate justice on July 27, 1894. He was reelected in 1900 and 1909. On January 10, 1912, he was elected to fill the unexpired term of Chief Justice Ira B. Jones who had resigned to run for governor.

Gary died on December 10, 1926, and is buried at the Upper Long Cane Cemetery in Abbeville, South Carolina.

References

External links
 A Vindication of the South: Address delivered by Eugene B. Gary at Abbeville, South Carolina, on Memorial day, May 10, 1917.  Includes autograph

Justices of the South Carolina Supreme Court
Chief Justices of the South Carolina Supreme Court
1854 births
People from Cokesbury, South Carolina
1926 deaths
Place of death missing
People from Abbeville, South Carolina